Adhila Nasarin versus State Commissioner of Police   (2022) is case where Kerala High Court held that the adults in mutually consenting relationship should be left to live their lives as per their informed choice.

See also 

 LGBT rights in India
 Deepika Singh v. Central Administrative Tribunal (2022)
 S Sushma v. Commissioner of Police (2021)
 Navtej Singh Johar v. Union of India (2018)

References 

High Courts of India cases
Indian LGBT rights case law
LGBT rights in India
2022 in LGBT history
2022 in India